Pike Place Chowder is a seafood restaurant with two locations in Seattle, in the U.S. state of Washington.

Description 
Pike Place Chowder has two locations in Seattle, on Post Alley in Pike Place Market; and in Pacific Place. The seafood restaurant specializes in New England clam chowder; varieties include clam, crab and oyster, salmon, and scallop, and all are served with a sourdough bread bowl. The menu has also included crab and lobster rolls as well as seafood bisque. The Pike Place Market location has outdoor seating.

History 
Lucas Peterson of Eater said the restaurant "began entering chowder cook-offs in the 1990s on the both coasts, and absolutely destroyed the competition with their secret recipe. Now, they're serving up steaming bowls of multiple chowder varieties to lines of locals and tourists each day."

References 
Chona Kasinger included the restaurant in Thrillist's 2015 list of "The 10 Things You Must Eat in Seattle This Summer", and Naomi Tomky included the clam chowder in the website's 2016 list of "The 50 Best Things to Eat and Drink at Pike Place Market".

Meg van Huygen included the restaurant in Eater Seattle's 2019 list of "10 Seattle Tourist Trap Restaurants That Are Actually Good". In 2020, during the COVID-19 pandemic, the website's Gabe Guarente included the business in a list of "Where to Score Some Great Crab Rolls in Seattle for Takeout". Eater Seattle also included Pike Place Chowder in a 2021 list of "Where to Get Comforting Bowls of Soups and Stews for Wintry Seattle Weather". Guarente included the restaurant in 2021 overview of "Great Places to Get Crab and Lobster Rolls Around the Seattle Area". In "20 Great Restaurants Near Pike Place Market", the site's Jade Yamazaki Stewart wrote in 2022, "Those lucky enough to arrive at this award-winning spot before the lines start forming should seize the opportunity to experience why the hype is justified. The standard New England chowder is satisfying, but for a truly Northwest experience, best to go for the smoked salmon and seafood bisque."

In a 2021 list of 26 "iconic Seattle bites", the Seattle Post-Intelligencer said, "The New England clam chowder at Pike Place Chowder has been named the No. 1 dish among Yelpers across the country." Allecia Vermillion included the restaurant in Seattle Metropolitan's 2022 overview of "The Best Seafood in Seattle".

See also 

 List of seafood restaurants

References

External links 

 
 LARRY MELLUM, OWNER OF PIKE PLACE CHOWDER at Pike Place Market Foundation
 Pike Place Chowder at Pacific Place
 Pike Place Chowder at Visit Seattle
 Pike Place Chowder at Zomato

Central Waterfront, Seattle
Downtown Seattle
Pike Place Market
Seafood restaurants in Seattle